Melissa Amy Ratcliff ( Larsen; born November 1976) is an American paralegal and Democratic politician from Cottage Grove, Wisconsin.  She is a member of the Wisconsin State Assembly, representing Wisconsin's 46th Assembly district since January 2023.  She is also currently a member of the Dane County board of supervisors and the Cottage Grove village board of trustees. 

Her name was Melissa Amy Kartes during her first marriage, from November 1995 through June 1998.

Biography
Melissa Ratcliff was born Melissa Larsen and was raised in Wausau, Wisconsin.  She graduated from Wausau East High School in 1995. She earned her paralegal certification from Madison Area Technical College and has worked for 20 years as a paralegal at the Eisenberg Law Offices in Madison, Wisconsin.

Political career

In the Spring of 2018, Ratcliff won her first public office when she was elected to the Cottage Grove village board.  Later that year, in the Summer of 2018, incumbent Dane County board member Danielle Williams resigned her seat in order to accept a job as a lobbyist for the county government.  The Dane County board chair, Sharon Corrigan, chose Ratcliff from a number of applicants to fill out the remainder of Williams' term, and Ratcliff's selection was ratified by a vote of the county board on September 6, 2018.  She was subsequently elected to a full term on the board in the 2020 Spring election and was re-elected in 2022.

Just after the Spring 2022 election, incumbent state representative Gary Hebl announced he would retire after nine terms in the Assembly.  Within hours of his announcement, Ratcliff entered the race for the Democratic nomination in Hebl's 46th Assembly district.  Ultimately, four other candidates would also join the Democratic primary contest in the heavily Democratic district.  Ratcliff centered her experience with local and county government, and ultimately prevailed in the primary with 36% of the vote.  Her opponent in the general election was Andrew McKinney, who she had earlier defeated in the April 2022 county board election.  She ultimately won 70% of the vote in the general election.

Personal life and family
Melissa Larsen was engaged to Daniel Kartes when still a student in high school, they married six months after her high school graduation, but ultimately divorced three years later.  Subsequently, she married Philip Ratcliff and took his last name.  Melissa and Philip Ratcliff have two children together and reside in Cottage Grove, Wisconsin.

Electoral history

Dane County Board (2020, 2022)

| colspan="6" style="text-align:center;background-color: #e9e9e9;"| General Election, April 7, 2020

| colspan="6" style="text-align:center;background-color: #e9e9e9;"| General Election, April 5, 2022

Wisconsin Assembly (2022)

| colspan="6" style="text-align:center;background-color: #e9e9e9;"| Democratic Primary, August 9, 2022

| colspan="6" style="text-align:center;background-color: #e9e9e9;"| General Election, November 8, 2022

References

External links
 Campaign website
 Official (county) website
 
 Melissa Ratcliff at Wisconsin Vote
 

1976 births
Living people
Democratic Party members of the Wisconsin State Assembly 
Women state legislators in Wisconsin  
People from Cottage Grove, Wisconsin
People from Wausau, Wisconsin
21st-century American women politicians
County supervisors in Wisconsin
Madison Area Technical College alumni